Indian Beach is a town in Carteret County, North Carolina, United States. The population was 112 as of the 2010 census.

Geography
Indian Beach is located in southern Carteret County at  (34.687911, -76.891498), on Bogue Banks, a barrier island along the Atlantic Ocean. It is bordered to the west by the town of Emerald Isle and to the east by Pine Knoll Shores. To the north is Bogue Sound, separating the town from the mainland, and to the south is the Atlantic. The town consists of two sections, separated by the unincorporated neighborhood of Salter Path.

Demographics

At the 2000 census there were 95 people, 50 households, and 31 families in the town. The population density was 159.9 people per square mile (62.2/km). There were 1,218 housing units at an average density of 2,049.9 per square mile (797.1/km).  The racial makeup of the town was 95.79% White, 3.16% Pacific Islander, and 1.05% from two or more races. Hispanic or Latino of any race were 2.11%.

Of the 50 households 14.0% had children under the age of 18 living with them, 54.0% were married couples living together, 4.0% had a female householder with no husband present, and 38.0% were non-families. 34.0% of households were one person and 10.0% were one person aged 65 or older. The average household size was 1.90 and the average family size was 2.35.

The age distribution was 10.5% under the age of 18, 2.1% from 18 to 24, 20.0% from 25 to 44, 31.6% from 45 to 64, and 35.8% 65 or older. The median age was 59 years. For every 100 females, there were 97.9 males. For every 100 females age 18 and over, there were 97.7 males.

The median household income was $47,250 and the median family income  was $45,250. Males had a median income of $49,583 versus $37,500 for females. The per capita income for the town was $25,826. There were 6.5% of families and 5.0% of the population living below the poverty line, including no under eighteens and none of those over 64.

References

External links
 Town of Indian Beach official website

Towns in Carteret County, North Carolina
Towns in North Carolina
Beaches of North Carolina
Bogue Banks
Landforms of Carteret County, North Carolina